Nirmal Chandra Sinha (1911–1997) was an Indian tibetologist, author, the founder director of Sikkim Research Institute of Tibetology (SIRT), presently known as the Namgyal Institute of Tibetology, Deorali near Gangtok. He was known for his contributions to Buddhism and the documentation of the history of Tibet and other states of Central Asia. He was honoured by the Government of India in 1971 with Padma Shri, the fourth highest Indian civilian award.

Biography
Nirmal Chandra Sinha was born in 1911 in Ranchi in the Indian state of Jharkhand, formerly in Bihar. After securing a master's degree from the Presidency College, Calcutta, he joined as a member of faculty of Hooghly Mohsin College, in Chinsurah, West Bengal and later, as a professor of history at Behrampur College before joining the government service and was appointed as the cultural attache at the political office (residency) in 1955. Working as the attache, he toured Tibet in 1956 as a member of the Indian delegation that toured the country for inviting Dalai Lama. Thereafter, he worked at the Indian Archive where he had the opportunity to work under renowned educationist and former Union Minister of Education, Triguna Sen. In 1958, when the Sikkim Research Institute of Tibetology, present day Namgyal Institute of Tibetology (NIT), was established, Sinha was appointed as its founder director. He worked there till his retirement in 1987 after which he moved to Siliguri and took up the post as the Centenary Professor of International Relations at the University of Calcutta.

During his tenure as the director of NIT, Sinha contributed significantly to the Bulletin of Tibetology, a bi-annual publication by the institute. He was a scholar of many languages such as Tibetan, Sanskrit, Mongolian and Chinese which helped him in his writings. He wrote several articles in Sikkim Express and Gangtok Times and his last article, Lenin and Buddhism, written in July 1997 was published in the latter. He also published a book, Indian war economy, in 1962, co-written with P. N. Khera. A recipient of Prema Dorjee award from the Chogyal of Sikkim, he was awarded the civilian honour of Padma Shri by the Government of India in 1971. Sinha died on 3 August 1997 at Sunrise Nursing Home, Siliguri, at the age of 86. Namgyal Institute of Tibetology honoured him by compiling his selected works which was published as a book in 2008 under the name, A Tibetologist in Sikkim.

Articles
List of articles published by Sinha in Bulletin of Tibetology.

 Historical status of Tibet
 Hacha for Lhasa
 Tibet's status during the World War
 On tantra
 The missing context of Chos
 Was the Simla Convention not signed?
 The Himalayas
 The Lama
 The grey wolf
 The refuge: India, Tibet and Mongolia
 The sKyabs mgon
 Chos srid gnyis-ldan
 Sino-Indian inroads into North India
 Obituary: Libing Athing
 The Ancient path of the Buddhas
 Brahmana and Kshatriya
 Gilgit (and Swat)
 The Simla Convention 1914: a Chinese puzzle
 Obituary Yapshi Pheunkhang
 Sanskrit across the Himalayas
 India and Tibet
 In memoriam
 Budddhasasana in Tibet
 Stupid barbarian / animal symbols in Buddhist art
 Tibetan Studies in modern India
 Peace and war in man's mind
 Aspects of Buddhism
 Publications through twenty years
 The universal man
 Articles of Tibet trade 1784
 Publications through twenty-five years
 Losar
 About Dipankara Atisa
 Geographical notices of India
 On Tibetology
 Ten priceless images
 Relics of Asokan monks
 Tradition and traditional sources
 Dharma Tantra and Atisa
 On names and titles
 What constitute the importance of Atisa
 Uttarukuru in Tibetan tradition
 Inventory of Tibetan historical literature
 Tantra in Mahayana texts
 Stupa symbol
 Inner Asia and India through the ages
 A preface to Mahayana icononography
 Tibetology contra Nepalese
 Sahasra Buddha
 Kalachakra Tantra
 Buddharupa: observation on the evolution of Buddha image
 Making of Dharmaraja
 Dharamaraja Asoka
 Asoka's dhamma: a testimony of monuments
 Asoka's Dharma

See also

 Namgyal Institute of Tibetology

References

Further reading
 
 

Recipients of the Padma Shri in literature & education
1911 births
1997 deaths
People from Ranchi
Scholars from Jharkhand
Indian male writers
20th-century Indian historians
Tibetologists
University of Calcutta alumni
Academic staff of the University of Calcutta
Indian Foreign Service officers